Baitapur is a village in West Champaran district in the Indian state of Bihar.

Demographics
 India census, Baitapur had a population of 1856 in 362 households. Males constitute 50.53% of the population and females 49.46%. Baitapur has an average literacy rate of 72%, lower than the national average of 74%: male literacy is about 65%, and female literacy is 40.65%. In Baitapur, 19.55% of the population is under 6 years of age.
Ram Janki Mandir situated in West side is best remarkable place in Baitapur.

References

Villages in West Champaran district